Marshall S. Roth (1901 – January 3, 1995) was a major general in the United States Air Force.

Biography
Roth was born in Chicago, Illinois in 1901. He died on January 3, 1995.

Career
Roth graduated from the Northwestern Military and Naval Academy in 1925 and the United States Military Academy in 1929. During World War II he served with the Eighth Air Force, the Fifth Air Force, the Fourteenth Air Force, the Tenth Air Force, the Ninth Air Force, and the Fifteenth Air Force. Following the war he was given command of the 375th Troop Carrier Group and the 317th Troop Carrier Group. In 1948 he entered the National War College. Later in his career he served as Chief of Staff of Air Defense Command. His retirement was effective as of July 31, 1967.

Awards he received include the Legion of Merit.

References

Military personnel from Chicago
United States Air Force generals
Recipients of the Legion of Merit
United States Army personnel of World War II
United States Military Academy alumni
National War College alumni
1995 deaths
1901 births